Martinus "Tinus" van Gelder (2 December 1911 – 26 August 1999) was a Dutch cyclist. He competed in the tandem event at the 1948 Summer Olympics.

See also
 List of Dutch Olympic cyclists

References

External links
 

1911 births
1999 deaths
Dutch male cyclists
Olympic cyclists of the Netherlands
Cyclists at the 1948 Summer Olympics
People from Semarang Regency
Dutch people of the Dutch East Indies